Jacqueline Najuma Stewart is a University of Chicago professor of cinema studies and director of the nonprofit arts organization, Black Cinema House. She has written about the history of African Americans in filmmaking in Migrating to the Movies: Cinema and Black Urban Modernity (2005), co-authored, L.A. Rebellion: Creating a New Black Cinema (2015), and with Charles Musser co-curated the DVD set Pioneers of African-American Cinema (2016).  Stewart has served on the National Film Preservation Board (NFPB) of the Library of Congress and chaired the NFPB Diversity Task Force.  In 2005, she founded the South Side Home Movie Project, which collects, preserves, as a cultural and historical resource, the homemade films of residents of South Side, Chicago, together with interviews of creators. 

In September 2019, Stewart also became the first African-American host of Turner Classic Movies, as host for Silent Sunday Nights.  Taking a sabbatical from the university, in 2021 she was named the inaugural artistic director at the Academy Museum of Motion Pictures.

Stewart was raised on Chicago's South Side and graduated from Kenwood Academy High School.  She received her BA from Stanford University, and her AM and PhD both from the University of Chicago (UC). She taught at the university from 1999 to 2006, and then moved to an associate professorship at Northwestern University, returning to UC in 2013. In 2018, she was elected to the American Academy of Arts and Sciences. In 2021, she was awarded a MacArthur Foundation Fellowship.

On July 6, 2022, the Academy Museum Of Motion Pictures announced Stewart's appointment as director and president of the institution.

References

External links
: interview

Living people
University of Chicago faculty
University of Chicago alumni
Stanford University alumni
Year of birth missing (living people)
Northwestern University faculty
American Academy of Arts and Sciences
MacArthur Fellows
African-American academics